Euphaedra laguerrei, the insipid Themis forester, is a butterfly in the family Nymphalidae. It is found in Senegal, Burkina Faso, Sierra Leone and western Ivory Coast. The habitat consists of forests.

The larvae feed on Cola laurifolia.

References

Butterflies described in 1979
laguerrei